Wappocomo is an unincorporated community in Hampshire County in the U.S. state of West Virginia. The community is located south of Springfield on West Virginia Route 28 at Hanging Rocks along the South Branch Potomac River. Wappocomo has also historically been referred to as The Rocks, Wapocoma, and Wapocomo.

The community's name comes from the Native Americans of the area, Wappocomo meaning South Branch Potomac River in the local Indian language.

Wappocomo has become a popular location on the South Branch for summer campsites with both locals and out-of-state visitors. It should not be confused with the Wapocoma Campgrounds, located five miles south of Romney on South Branch River Road (West Virginia Secondary Route 8).

Historic site 
The Rocks, a 19th-century white clapboard farmhouse

References

External links

Unincorporated communities in Hampshire County, West Virginia
Populated places on the South Branch Potomac River
Unincorporated communities in West Virginia
South Branch Valley Railroad